Natashia Deón is an American novelist, attorney, and activist. She was an NAACP Image Awards Nominee for her debut novel, Grace which also won the 2017 American Library Association's Black Caucus Award for Best Debut Fiction and was named one of The New York Times Critics’ Top Books of 2016 by critic Jennifer Senior. Her second novel, The Perishing, is slated to be released November 2, 2021.

Education and Career

Law career
Deón graduated from high school at 16, finished her undergraduate degree from Cal State Long Beach at 19, and moved on to graduate from Trinity Law School with her law doctorate while still in her early 20s. She started practicing corporate law which took her to San Francisco, London, and Los Angeles. In 2010, she shifted her legal career to become a criminal defense attorney. In 2018, she founded the REDEEMED Project, which paired writers and lawyers with those convicted of crimes in order to help clear their criminal records and help them reenter society.

Writing and Teaching Career
Aside from her debut novel’s critical acclaim, Grace has also been translated into Mandarin. Deón completed her MFA from UC Riverside, Palm Desert, was a PEN America Fellow. She teaches writing at UCLA and Antioch University and is a speaker with Blue Flower Arts, a literary speaking agency. She also founded the LA-based Dirty Laundry Lit reading series that was "equal parts party and reading."

Activism

In addition to her REDEEMED Project activism, in 2017, Deón was a U.S. Delegate to Armenia as part of the U.S. Embassy’s reconciliation efforts between Turkey and Armenia.

References 

1978 births
Living people
21st-century American novelists
21st-century American women writers
African-American novelists
American women academics
American women essayists
American women novelists
Novelists from California
Writers from Los Angeles
21st-century African-American women writers
21st-century African-American writers
20th-century African-American people
20th-century African-American women